Elections to Kirklees Metropolitan Borough Council were held on 10 June 2004. The whole council was up for election with boundary changes since the last election in 2003. The council stayed under no overall control.

Council results

Council Composition
After the election the composition of the council was:

Ward results

Almondbury ward

Ashbrow ward

Batley East ward

Batley West ward

Birstall and Birkenshaw ward

Cleckheaton ward

Colne Valley ward

Crosland Moor and Netherton ward

Dalton ward

Denby Dale ward

Dewsbury East ward

Dewsbury South ward

Dewsbury West ward

Golcar ward

Greenhead ward

Heckmondwike ward

Holme Valley North ward

Holme Valley South ward

Kirkburton ward

Lindley ward

Liversedge and Gomersal ward

Mirfield ward

Newsome ward

References

2004 English local elections
2004
2000s in West Yorkshire